Achnanthes is a genus of diatoms belonging to the family Achnanthaceae.

The genus was described in 1822 by Jean Baptiste Bory de Saint-Vincent.

The genus has cosmopolitan distribution.

Species:
 Achnanthes aapajaervensis Cleve-Euler
 Achnanthes abundans Manguin, 1954
 Achnanthes acares Hohn & Hellerman
 Achnanthes acus Simonsen
 Achnanthes acuta Frenguelli

References

Achnanthales